Catherine Malia Godbold (23 September 1974 – 4 May 2018) was an Australian actress. She was best known for her role as Deborah Hale Regnery on The Saddle Club and as Meg Bowman in Home and Away. Following the cancellation of Newlyweds in which she starred as Jules Carter, Godbold began doing voice over work in between auditions. In 1997, she was cast as Sondra Pike in Neighbours.

Godbold was the daughter of Australian broadcaster Rosemary Margan, whom she portrayed in the Graham Kennedy biopic The King. In May 2007, after The Saddle Club was picked up for a third season, Godbold was diagnosed with brain cancer. She had the tumour removed and began chemotherapy.

A second brain tumour developed in January 2018, which proved to be terminal. Godbold died on 4 May 2018, aged 43. Godbold's funeral was held on 10 May 2018. Godbold and her mother are buried together at Springvale Botanical Cemetery.

Filmography
The King: The Story of Graham Kennedy – Rosemary Margan
The Saddle Club – Deborah Hale Regnery (seasons 1 & 2)
Blonde – Assistant #2 
Blue Heelers – Gail Hutton 
Neighbours – Sondra Pike 
Newlyweds – Jules Carter 
Hey Dad..! – Cassie 
Alex: The Spirit of a Champion – Maggie Benton 
Home and Away – Meg Bowman 
Chances – Nikki Taylor
More Winners: His Master's Ghost – Sarah O'Grady 
Frontline – Herself 
This Night of Nights – Herself
Amandine Malabul: Cosie

References

External links

1974 births
2018 deaths
Australian film actresses
Australian television actresses
Deaths from brain cancer in Australia
20th-century Australian actresses
21st-century Australian actresses
Actresses from Melbourne